Jorn is a Norwegian hard rock and metal band fronted by vocalist Jørn Lande. Other members include guitarist Tore Moren, bassist Sid Ringsby and drummer Francesco Jovino. The band was established in 2000 by Lande and the debut album Starfire was released the same year. The band was the main artist at ProgPower USA in 2006, and they played at the Norway Rock Festival and the Metal Heart Festival in 2007, as well as the Jorddunst Festival in 2009. They also played at the Norway Rock Festival in 2010.

Discography

Albums

Live albums

Compilation and other albums
2007: Unlocking the Past (album of covers)
2007: The Gathering (compilation album)
2009: Dukebox (compilation album)

Band members

Band members/guests 

Current lineup:
Tore Moren - guitars (Worldchanger, The Duke, Unlocking the Past, The Gathering, Live in America, Lonely Are The Brave, Spirit Black, Dio, Live in Black, Bring Heavy Rock To The Land, Live on Death Road, guest on Starfire, additional guitars on Heavy Rock Radio)
Sid Ringsby - bass (Worldchanger, Lonely Are The Brave, Spirit Black, Live on Death Road, additional bass on Heavy Rock Radio)
Beata Polak - drums (Live on Death Road)
Alessandro Del Vecchio - keyboards (Heavy Rock Radio, Life On Death Road, Live on Death Road)

Former:

Guitars:
Jørn Viggo Lofstad - guitars (Out to Every Nation, The Duke, Unlocking the Past, The Gathering, Live in America, Lonely Are The Brave, additional guitars on Heavy Rock Radio)
Jimmy Iversen - guitars (Spirit Black, Bring Heavy Rock To The Land, Traveller, additional guitars on Heavy Rock Radio)
Trond Holter - guitars (Traveller, Heavy Rock Radio)
Tor Erik Myhre - guitars (Dio, Live in Black)
Alex Beyrodt - guitars (Life On Death Road)
Igor Gianola - guitars (Live, additional guitars on Spirit Black and Dio)
Jon Berg - guitars (additional guitars on Spirit Black)
Tore Østby - guitars (guest on Starfire, Unlocking the Past) 
Ralph Santolla - guitars (guest on Starfire, Unlocking the Past) 
Ronni Le Tekrø - guitars (guest on Starfire, Unlocking the Past) 
Gus G - guitars (guest on Life On Death Road)
Craig Goldy - guitars (guest on Life On Death Road)

Bass:
Morty Black - bass (The Duke, The Gathering, Unlocking the Past)
Nic Angileri - bass (Dio, Live in Black, Bring Heavy Rock To The Land, additional bass on Spirit Black and Heavy Rock Radio)
Steinar Krokmo - bass (Live in America, guest on Unlocking the Past)
Thomas Bekkevold - bass (Heavy Rock Radio)
Magnus Rosén - bass (Out to Every Nation)
Bernt Jansen - bass (Traveller)
Mat Sinner - bass (Life On Death Road)
Espen Mjöen - bass (additional Bass on Lonely Are The Brave, Spirit Black and Traveller)

Drums:
Willy Bendiksen - drums (The Duke, Unlocking the Past, The Gathering, Live in America, Lonely Are The Brave, Spirit Black, Dio, Live in Black, Bring Heavy Rock To The Land, Traveller, guest on Starfire, additional drums on Heavy Rock Radio)
Francesco Jovino - drums (Heavy Rock Radio, Life On Death Road, Live on Death Road)
Stian Kristoffersen - drums (Out to Every Nation, guest on Live in America)
Jan Axel von Blomberg - drums (Worldchanger)
Christian Svendsen - drums (Live)
John Macaluso - drums (Starfire)
Jon A . Narum -  drums, samples, bass, guitars, melotrone (guest on Starfire)
Beata Polak - drums (Live on Death Road)

Keyboards:
Dag Stokke - keyboards (Starfire)
Ronny Tegner - keyboards (Out to Every Nation)
Lasse Jensen - keyboards (additional keyboards on Heavy Rock Radio)
Lasse Finbråten – keyboards (guest on Live in America)

References

Norwegian musical groups